The 2009 Atlantic Hockey Tournament was the 6th Atlantic Hockey Tournament played between March 7 and March 21, 2009, at campus locations and at the Blue Cross Arena in Rochester, New York. Air Force won their third consecutive Atlantic Hockey Men's Ice Hockey Tournament and received Atlantic Hockey's automatic bid to the 2009 NCAA Division I Men's Ice Hockey Tournament.

Format
The tournament features four rounds of play. In the first round, the seventh and tenth seeds and eighth and ninth seeds play a single game with the winner advancing to the quarterfinals. There, the first seed and lowest ranked first round winner, the second seed and highest ranked first round winner, the third and sixth seeds, and the fourth and fifth seeds play a best-of-three series, with the winner advancing to the semifinals. In the semifinals, the highest and lowest seeds and second highest and second lowest seeds play a single-game, with the winner advancing to the championship game and the loser advancing to the third place game. The tournament champion received an automatic bid to the 2009 NCAA Men's Division I Ice Hockey Tournament.

Regular season standings
Note: GP = Games played; W = Wins; L = Losses; T = Ties; PTS = Points; GF = Goals For; GA = Goals Against

Bracket

Note: * denotes overtime period(s)

First round

(7) Holy Cross vs. (10) American International

(8) Sacred Heart vs. (9) Connecticut

Quarterfinals

(1) Air Force vs. (8) Sacred Heart

(2) RIT vs. (7) Holy Cross

(3) Mercyhurst vs. (6) Army

(4) Bentley vs. (5) Canisius

Semifinals

(1) Air Force vs. (4) Bentley

(2) RIT vs. (3) Mercyhurst

Championship

(1) Air Force vs. (3) Mercyhurst

Tournament awards

All-Tournament Team
G Andrew Volkening (Air Force)
D Gregg Flynn (Air Force)
D Scott Mathis (Air Force)
F Cameron Burt (RIT)
F Matt Fairchild* (Air Force)
F Scott Pitt (Mercyhurst)
* Most Valuable Player(s)

References

Atlantic Hockey
Atlantic Hockey Tournament